Ministry of National Security (MNS) is the primary law enforcement and national defense agency within the Commonwealth of the Bahamas. MNS has responsibility for customs and immigration, defense and the national police force. Agencies located within the portfolio of the MNS include:
 Royal Bahamas Defence Force
 Royal Bahamas Police Force
 Bahamas Customs Service
 Bahamas Immigration Department
 Bahamas Prison Service

The current minister of national security is Wayne Munroe, Q.C.

References

National Security
Bahamas
Bahamas
Bahamas